is a Japanese voice actress and singer formerly with I'm Enterprise and now affiliated with 81 Produce.

Filmography

Animation

Film

Video games

Drama CD

Other dubbing

References

External links
 Official agency profile 

 Maria Yamamoto at Hitoshi Doi's Seiyuu Database
 Maria Yamamoto at Oricon 
 

1981 births
Living people
Anime musicians
I'm Enterprise voice actors
Japanese video game actresses
Japanese voice actresses
Singers from Tokyo
Voice actresses from Tokyo
21st-century Japanese singers
81 Produce voice actors